While successful at the Quarter Horse racetrack, Ought To Go (born 1967) was far more successful in the breeding shed, producing twelve foals. Ten of those foals started and won races.

Life

Ought To Go was a 1967 sorrel filly, sired by Go Man Go and out of Do Good Bam. Do Good Bam was a half sister of Chicado V, having the same dam, Do Good, but different sires. Do Good Bam's sire was a Thoroughbred stallion named War Bam, while Chicado V was sired by Chicaro Bill.

Racing career 
Ought To Go raced for three years, starting 29 times. From those starts, she won seven times, came in second five times, and was third seven times. She earned $11,852.00 and 58 American Quarter Horse Association (or AQHA) racing points. Her racing points earned her an AQHA Superior Race Horse award along with her Race Register of Merit. The highest speed rating she attained was AAA.

Breeding record 
Ought To Go produced twelve foals. Ten of her foals started and all of her starters won races, with the total earned by her offspring totally $492,019.00. Further descendants include Fishers Dash, Check Her Twice, Chick Him Out, First Femme, Old Habits, Class with Cash, Society Road, Solvency, See Me Gone, Miss Eye Opener, Somekindadash, and Daring Difference.

Honors 
Ought To Go was inducted into the AQHA Hall of Fame in 2003.

Pedigree

Notes

References

 All Breed Pedigree Database Pedigree of Chicado V retrieved on June 26, 2007
 All Breed Pedigree Database Pedigree for Ought To Go retrieved on June 30, 2007
 AQHA Hall of Fame retrieved on September 1, 2017

External links
 Ought To Go at Quarter Horse Directory
 Ought To Go at Quarter Horse Legends

American Quarter Horse racehorses
1967 racehorse births
AQHA Hall of Fame (horses)